First Union Protestant Church of Mountain View is a historic church located at 7 Church Road in Bellmont, Franklin County, New York. It was built in 1915–1916, and is a one-story, rectangular, meetinghouse-style church.  It measures 26 feet, 4 inches wide and 45 feet, 6 inches deep.  It has a front gable roof and sits on a stone foundation.  It features a square corner steeple/tower with an open belfry.

It was added to the National Register of Historic Places in 2005.

References

External links
Church website

Churches on the National Register of Historic Places in New York (state)
Churches completed in 1916
20th-century churches in the United States
Churches in Franklin County, New York
National Register of Historic Places in Franklin County, New York